Beltone is a hearing aid company founded in 1940, headquartered in Chicago, Illinois, United States. Beltone products are sold in the United States, Canada, and over 40 countries across the globe.

In North America, Beltone has over 1500 independently owned "hearing care centers." Beltone provides hearing screenings, hearing aid fittings and follow-up care.  In addition, Beltone offers an aftercare program which covers Beltone hearing aids in several ways for as long as their patients own them.

The Beltone Hearing Care Foundation, a 501(c)(3) charitable organization, was established in 2014 with the intent to donate hearing instruments to those in need of hearing help who may otherwise be unable to access it. Both individuals and organizations are eligible to receive assistance from the Foundation through direct nominations by Beltone staff or network members.

Styles of hearing aids 
Beltone hearing aids come in dozens of styles. Beltone's smallest hearing aid, the Beltone microInvisa, is about the size of a raspberry. Known as an Invisible-in-the Canal (IIC) hearing aid, the Beltone microInvisa is custom-manufactured to conform to a patient's ear canal. That allows the hearing device to sit comfortably within the ear canal, out of sight.

Other popular models fall into the lightweight Behind-the-Ear (BTE) category. A very small case hides in the shadow behind the ear, and connects to the ear canal via a tiny, clear tube. BTE hearing aids let a patient have a hearing evaluation and receive hearing aids the same day. Beltone hearing aids are programmed to address an individual's specific hearing deficit.

Beltone's history 
 	1940: Sam Posen opens Beltone in Chicago, IL and introduces the Model H hearing aid
 	1944: Beltone launches Mono-Pac, the first all-in-one hearing aid in the industry
 	1946: Beltone releases Harmony – the smallest hearing aid available at the time
 	1969: Beltone creates earmolds for astronauts in the space program to protect their hearing during lift-off and re-entry
 	1971: Beltone begins conducting hearing loss research and development at their headquarters
 	1979: Beltone opens for business in Canada
 	1983: Beltone introduces its first custom in-the-canal (ITC) hearing aid
       1998: Beltone launches Beltone Digital – its first hearing aid with digital technology
       2011: Beltone introduces Beltone True  – a hearing aid capable of offering 2.4 GHz wireless streaming of sound from hand-held devices
       2014: Beltone releases Beltone First  – the first made for iPhone hearing aid 
       2014: Beltone releases Beltone Boost – designed for people with severe to profound hearing loss 
       2015: Beltone announces that its line of advanced hearing aids, including the Beltone First  and Beltone Boost, are now compatible with Android via the Beltone HearPlus app. Initially compatible with Samsung Galaxy S5, Beltone's hearing aids will expand to include other Android devices later in 2015.
       2015: Beltone launches Beltone Legend  – the first "Made for iPhone" custom hearing aid on the market 
       2015: Beltone expands connectivity with HearPlus App  for Apple Watch
       2015: Beltone expands Android Compatibility of its HearPlus App.
       2016: Beltone announces launch of Boost Plus  – a hearing aid for consumers with severe to profound hearing loss 
       2017: Beltone announces launch of Beltone Trust
       2018: Beltone announces launch of Beltone Amaze
       2020: Beltone Amaze Hearing Aids Win 2020 BIG Innovation Award

See also 

 Hearing loss
 Noise-induced hearing loss

References 

 Beltone First Release in the US

Companies based in Glenview, Illinois
Hearing aid manufacturers
Manufacturing companies based in Illinois
Medical technology companies of the United States